The São Toméan Workers Party (PTS) is an opposition political party in São Tomé and Príncipe. The president of the party is Anacleto Rolin.

The party participated in the 2002 legislative elections, launching candidates in four electoral districts. In total it got 4.87% of the votes. However it failed to win a seat in the National Assembly.

The party supported Patrice Trovoada in the 30 July 2006 presidential election. He won 38.82% of the vote, finishing a distant second to the incumbent Fradique de Menezes, who received 60.58% of the vote.

Political parties in São Tomé and Príncipe